Ignácio da Silva Oliveira (born 1 December 1996), simply known as Ignácio, is a Brazilian footballer who plays as a central defender for Liga 1 club Sporting Cristal.

Club career
Born in Currais Novos, Rio Grande do Norte, Ignácio represented  and Itapirense as a youth before making his senior debut with local side  in 2017, winning the second division of the Campeonato Potiguar.

On 12 April 2018, after impressing in the year's Potiguar, Ignácio joined Série D side ASSU on loan from Santa Cruz-RN. In July, after his club was knocked out of the competition, he moved to Bahia also on a temporary deal, and was initially assigned to their under-23 team.

Ignácio made his first team – and Série A – debut on 6 October 2018, coming on as a second-half substitute for Eric Ramires in a 2–2 away draw against Grêmio. The following 7 January, he signed a permanent deal until 2022 as the club bought 60% of his economic rights.

On 3 October 2020, after being rarely used, Ignácio was loaned to Série B side CSA until the end of the season. The following 28 May, he moved to Chapecoense also in a temporary deal.

Career statistics

Honours
Força e Luz
Campeonato Potiguar Segunda Divisão: 2017

Bahia
Campeonato Baiano: 2019, 2020

References

External links

1996 births
Living people
Brazilian footballers
Sportspeople from Rio Grande do Norte
Association football defenders
Campeonato Brasileiro Série A players
Campeonato Brasileiro Série B players
Campeonato Brasileiro Série D players
Esporte Clube Bahia players
Centro Sportivo Alagoano players
Associação Chapecoense de Futebol players